Gerald Mbamalu.  is the traditional ruler of Ojoto in Idemili-South Local Government Area of Anambra State, in Nigeria.

Early life 
He is the fourth child of Aloysius and Philomina Mbamalu. Mbamalu was crowned on April 1, 2018, as Eze Ojoto III and Ezeoranyelu I by the community alongside his Igwe-in-Council. He succeeded the late Igwe Augustine Obidiwe (Eze Ojoto II).

An official certificate of recognition was issued in accordance with the Traditional Rulers Act of 1981 by then Governor of Anambra State, Willie Obiano, on February 20, 2018. His first Ofalla was recorded on January 2, 2021 and New Yam festival on August 5, 2021.

Previous ojotos 
 Igwe Abel E. Adirika was crowned as Ezebube I of Ojoto (19th Century)
 HRH Igwe Augustine Obidiwe was crowned as Azeakajiofoana
 Igwe Gerald Mbamalu was crowned as Eze Ojoto III and Ezeoranyelu I (2018–present).

See also 
Obi of Onitsha
Oba of Benin
Olofin Adimula Oodua
Igwe Kenneth Onyeneke Orizu III

References

External links 
 Igwe Gerald Mbamalu Archives
 Eze Ojoto III celebrates Ofala Festival

Igbo monarchs
Nigerian traditional rulers
1967 births
Living people